Jorge Luis Sampaoli Moya (born 13 March 1960) is an Argentine football coach who was most recently the manager of Sevilla in La Liga. Sampaoli started out as a youth player and eventually switched to management after a severe injury.

Sampaoli started with an impressive coaching run at Coronel Bolognesi of Peru in 2004, and continued with brief but successful terms at O'Higgins of Chile and Emelec of Ecuador.

Sampaoli earned praise as the head coach of Universidad de Chile, winning three league titles and the Copa Sudamericana championship. This success led him to coach the Chilean men's national team in 2012, replacing Claudio Borghi. He led the Chile national football team to their first Copa América title, after defeating Argentina in the final in the 2015 tournament in Chile. He is well known for his attacking tactics which are similar to those of Marcelo Bielsa, according to the press and fans alike.

On 28 June 2016, Sampaoli signed a two-year contract with Sevilla. After spending only one year in Spain and  leading Sevilla to fourth spot in La Liga, and ensuring Champions League football the following season, Sampaoli left the club to coach the Argentina national team, where he left by mutual consent, after a shameful run in the 2018 FIFA World Cup among great hatred from Argentine fans. He eventually agreed to coach Brazilian club Santos in 2019, staying one year and leading the club to the second position in the league. In March 2021, he returned to manage in European football when he was appointed at French side Marseille. In October 2022, he returned to manage Sevilla. On 22 March 2023, he was sacked by Sevilla and replaced by Jose Luis Mendilibar.

Early life
Sampaoli was born in Casilda, a small town located in Caseros Department of the Santa Fe Province in Argentina. In his youth, he was very passionate about football, playing for amateur teams in his hometown league. He eventually joined Newell's Old Boys youth team, where he gained the nickname "Tobogán de piojos" (which literally translates to "lice slide") because of his premature baldness. While at the club he suffered a tibia and fibula injury in 1979, forcing him to retire from playing professional football at the age of 19. During his last playing years and his first managerial years, he also worked part-time at a bank.

Coaching career

Early career
In October 1991, aged just 31, Sampaoli acted as an interim coach for hometown side Club Atlético Alumni, as manager Mario Bonavera was out on a personal trip. During that season, he was already working as a fitness coach aside from being a defensive midfielder. He was given the role of manager of the club's youth setup in the following year, but only retired in 1993. In 1994 he was named manager of the first team, taking the club to the finals of the Liga Casildense de Fútbol, but lost it to CA 9 de Julio de Arequito. In the following season, he again reached the finals, but suffered defeat to the very same club.

For the 1996 season, Sampaoli was appointed at 9 Julio's rivals CA Belgrano de Arequito, and coached to win the year's league title with the side. In May of that year, he was hired by Primera B Metropolitana side Argentino de Rosario, and ended the season in the 13th position. He subsequently returned to Alumni and Belgrano, before taking over CA Aprendices Casildenses in 1999; with the latter side, he won two consecutive Liga Casildense titles.

Sampaoli returned to a third stint with Alumni in 2001, after a short stint back at Argentino de Rosario in the previous year. Despite reaching the finals of the Liga Casildense, he lost it to former side Aprendices.

Juan Aurich
On 9 January 2002, Sampaoli was appointed coach of Peruvian Primera División side Juan Aurich; it was the first professional club in his career. On 24 February, he directed his first professional game against Universitario, where they lost 2–1 after leading the whole game due to a penalty scored by Carlos Flores (66th minute).

Sampaoli had a poor spell in Juan Aurich, directing only eight games, five of which the team lost and two where the team tied with Coopsol Trujillo and Alianza Lima. The team only won against Cienciano 2–0 with goals from César Sánchez and Flores. He left the club in April, when Aurich was sitting at the bottom of the table.

Sport Boys
Months later, in June, Sampaoli was hired by Sport Boys to direct the team in the Torneo Descentralizado, debuting with a 3–1 loss to Coopsol. His side finished sixth in the tournament, achieving important triumphs over Alianza (1–0 with a goal of Alfredo Carmona) and Universitario (2–0 with goals by Paolo de la Haza and Carmona again at Estadio Monumental). He left the club during the 2003 Torneo Descentralizado, after a player's strike.

Coronel Bolognesi
In 2004, Sampaoli was named coach of fellow top-tier side Coronel Bolognesi, replacing Roberto Mosquera. There, he had an irregular start, but soon coached to settle the team during the Peruvian 2005's Descentralizado, finishing fifth in the Apertura, and then coached to finish third in that same year's Clausura, taking the club to their first international competition.

Sampaoli opted to leave the club in December 2005, but returned on 27 June 2006, replacing compatriot Raúl Donsanti. Competing in the 2006's Clausura as well as in the Sudamericana tournament, his side finished third in the national league.

Sporting Cristal
In 2007, Sampaoli was hired as the head coach of Sporting Cristal. However, his time at Cristal turned out to be disappointing after 18 matches and only five wins. He was dismissed from the "Celestes" in May of that year, ending his Peruvian coaching career.

O'Higgins
On 12 December 2007, Sampaoli arrived in Chile to take over at O'Higgins, in the place of Jorge Garcés. In 2008, the team proved to be tough to crack for bigger Chilean teams, finishing third in that year's Apertura. They were eliminated by powerhouse Universidad de Chile in the playoff quarterfinals.

The next year turned out to be a tough year for Sampaoli, as "La Celeste" had an irregular campaign, where they finished in 8th place, and, despite qualifying to the 2009's Apertura Playoffs, ended up being thrashed 6–1 in the second leg of the quarterfinals by Unión Española. He resigned in August 2009, being replaced by Geraldo Silva.

Emelec
On 18 December 2009, Sampaoli was named Emelec coach for the upcoming season. Under his guidance, the team competed in the 2010 Copa Libertadores, being eliminated in the group stage, but had an impressive run in the local competition, finishing first in the 2010 tournament first stage, earning them a spot in the 2010 Copa Sudamericana and 2011 Copa Libertadores preliminary stage.

That year, Emelec faced Liga de Quito, who finished in first place in that year's second half, but ended up losing.

Universidad de Chile
On 15 December 2010, Sampaoli was presented as coach of Universidad de Chile. With the side he achieved impressive results, winning the 2011 Apertura, the 2011 Clausura, the 2012 Apertura and the 2011 Copa Sudamericana. He left the club after accepting an offer from the national team, with 80 wins in 135 matches.

Chile national team
On 3 December 2012, Chile's Asociación Nacional de Fútbol Profesional announced that Sampaoli would take over as coach of the national team after a successful run with La U. His arrival brought about a turnaround in performances and results, with Chile winning three of their first four World Cup qualifiers after his appointment. Under Sampaoli, Chile returned to the energetic, high-pressing game of Marcelo Bielsa, the Argentinian coach who inspired Sampaoli's coaching philosophy.

In 2015, Sampaoli led Chile to victory in the 2015 Copa America, the country's first major trophy. On 30 November of that year, he was named on the final three-man shortlist for the 2015 FIFA World Coach of the Year award, joined by Spaniards Pep Guardiola (Bayern Munich) and Luis Enrique (Barcelona).

On 19 January 2016, Sampaoli resigned as coach of Chile, after allegedly having disputes with Arturo Salah, recently elected president of ANFP.

Sevilla
On 27 June 2016, La Liga club Sevilla FC announced that Sampaoli would take over Sevilla on a two-year deal. On 15 January 2017, his side beat Zinedine Zidane's Real Madrid 2–1, ending their 40-match unbeaten run.

Argentina

On 20 May 2017, the Argentine Football Association announced that Sampaoli would take over as the new coach of the national team. He was officially presented on 1 June 2017. Sampaoli's first game in charge was a friendly match against Brazil on 9 June in Australia, with Argentina winning 1–0.

However, Argentina greatly struggled during the qualifiers, and it took a Lionel Messi hat trick at Ecuador to confirm qualification for the 2018 FIFA World Cup. On 14 May 2018, Sampaoli announced a 35-man preliminary squad for the 2018 World Cup. He announced the final squad on 21 May 2018.

At the World Cup, Argentina had drawn 1–1 with Iceland during their opening World Cup group match, an underwhelming performance that drew criticism from former Argentine captain and coach Diego Maradona. In the next group match, Argentina suffered a heavy 0–3 loss by Croatia due to "a defence left exposed, a midfield that was overrun and an attack that was blunted", which put them on the brink of elimination and led to unconfirmed reports that Sampaoli would be sacked. Senior members of the team including Messi and Javier Mascherano confronted Sampaoli and his assistants in the dressing room, while also approaching members of the Argentine FA to discuss their concerns, and there were also various rumors that Messi was involved in team selection which dismissed Sampaoli's leadership, evoking a formation based on the decisions of Argentine players. The match against Croatia was his 13th game in charge, where he had used 13 lineups and a total of 59 players, and despite a myriad of attacking choices the defence was poor.

Sampaoli remained in his position, as Argentina defeated Nigeria 2–1 in the third group match to advance to the knockout stage. In the round of 16, Argentina lost to France 4–3 and were eliminated from the tournament.

On 15 July 2018, the Argentine Football Association announced that Sampaoli had left his position as national coach by mutual consent.

Santos
On 13 December 2018, Brazilian club Santos FC announced that Sampaoli reached an "agreement in principle" to become the club's coach for the 2019 season. He signed a two-year contract on 17 December, being presented the following day.

Sampaoli was highly praised by the media during his time at the club, specifically due to the offensive football displayed. Despite being knocked out of the year's Campeonato Paulista and Copa Sudamericana, he took the club to the second position in the Série A.

On 9 December 2019, Sampaoli resigned; Santos announced the departure of the coach in the following day.

Atlético Mineiro
On 1 March 2020, Sampaoli took charge of Atlético Mineiro. On 22 February 2021, Sampaoli requested the termination of his contract at the end of the current season. On the same day Atlético Mineiro announced that they had accepted the termination of Sampaoli contract.

Marseille
On 26 February 2021, Ligue 1 club Olympique de Marseille announced Sampaoli as their coach until June 2023. He succeeded Andre Villas-Boas.

Return to Sevilla
On 6 October 2022, Sevilla announced the return of Sampaoli to be their coach.

Managerial statistics

Honours
Belgrano de Arequito
Liga Casildense de Fútbol (Division 5): 1996

Aprendices Casildenses
Liga Casildense de Fútbol (Division 5): 1999, 2000

Universidad de Chile
Torneo Apertura: 2011, 2012
Torneo Clausura: 2011
Copa Sudamericana: 2011

Atlético Mineiro
Campeonato Mineiro: 2020

Chile
Copa América: 2015

Individual
Copa América Team of the Tournament (Manager): 2015
South American Coach of the Year: 2015
IFFHS World's Best National Coach: 2015
La Liga Manager of the Month: October 2016

References

External links

 
 

1960 births
Living people
2014 FIFA World Cup managers
2015 Copa América managers
2018 FIFA World Cup managers
Argentina national football team managers
Argentine expatriate football managers
Argentine expatriate sportspeople in Chile
Argentine expatriate sportspeople in Ecuador
Argentine expatriate sportspeople in Peru
Argentine expatriate sportspeople in Spain
Argentine expatriate sportspeople in Brazil
Argentine expatriate sportspeople in France
Argentine football managers
Argentine footballers
Argentine people of Italian descent
Association football midfielders
Chile national football team managers
Coronel Bolognesi managers
C.S. Emelec managers
Expatriate football managers in Chile
Expatriate football managers in Ecuador
Expatriate football managers in Peru
Expatriate football managers in Spain
Expatriate football managers in Brazil
Expatriate football managers in France
Juan Aurich managers
La Liga managers
People from Casilda
Chilean Primera División managers
Sevilla FC managers
Sport Boys managers
Sporting Cristal managers
Sportspeople from Santa Fe Province
Universidad de Chile managers
Santos FC managers
Clube Atlético Mineiro managers
Olympique de Marseille managers
Association football coaches